A capon (from , genitive cāpōnis) is a male chicken that has been castrated or neutered, either physically or chemically, to improve the quality of its flesh for food, and, in some countries like Spain, fattened by forced feeding.

History

The origins of caponised chickens are contested. They were known in ancient China as well as in ancient Greece and ancient Rome.

An early record of caponisation is found under the Roman Republic: the Lex Faunia of 162 BC forbade fattening hens to conserve grain rations, so the Romans instead castrated roosters, which resulted in a doubling of size. 
It was also practiced later throughout medieval times, with gastronomic texts describing capons as preferred poultry since the ordinary fowl of the farmyard was regarded as peasant fare and "popular malice crediting monks with a weakness for capons."

In the early 20th century, France was internationally renowned for maintaining a strong caponisation tradition with widespread and established industries throughout the country.

William Shakespeare mentioned capon in the famous "All the world's a stage" monologue from his play As You Like It (written c.1600).  He similarly describes capon as a food of the wealthy.  The monologue describes human life as consisting of seven stages, and the fifth stage is a middle-aged man who has reached the point where he has acquired wisdom and wealth.  The monologue describes the fifth stage as:  "The Justice, In fair round belly, with a good capon lin'd".  In addition his character Sir John Falstaff is described as or implied to be fond of capons.

Effects of caponisation

Caponisation is the process of turning a cockerel into a capon. Caponisation can be done by surgically removing the bird's testes, or may also be accomplished through the use of estrogen implants. With either method, the male sex hormones normally present are no longer effective. Caponisation must be done before the rooster matures so that it develops without the influence of male sex hormones.

Capons, due to the lack of the male sex drive, are not as aggressive as normal roosters. This makes capons easier to handle and allows capons to be kept together with other capons since their reduced aggression prevents them from fighting.

The lack of sex hormones results in meat that is less gamey in taste. Capon meat is also more moist, tender and flavorful than that of a cockerel or a hen, which is due not only to the hormonal differences during the capon's development but also because capons are not as active as roosters, which makes their meat more tender and fatty.

Capons develop a smaller head, comb and wattle than those of a normal rooster.

Capons are fairly rare in industrial meat production. Chickens raised for meat are bred and raised so that they mature very quickly. Industrial chickens can be sent to market in as little as five weeks. Capons produced under these conditions will taste very similar to conventional chicken meat, making their production unnecessary.

Specialised production

Capons are produced in France, in several provinces, notably the Gers and Jura regions. They are a speciality of Bresse (Chapon de Bresse), where they have their own appellation to differentiate them from capons from other regions. In Bresse, they are exclusively produced from the Bresse blue foot breed (patte bleue), and fed a certain diet which makes it even more tender than from other regions and breeds, making it a desirable meat.

Capons are also produced in many regions of northern Italy, such as Piedmont, Friuli-Venezia Giulia, Emilia-Romagna, and Marche. In the early 20th century, capon was commonly eaten for the main family feast on Christmas in Tuscany and northern Italian regions, which was a rare treat for peasant or working class families.

In the gastronomy of Spain, capons are usually eaten during the Christmas season in the northern regions. Capons of Vilalba and Lugo are particularly famous and are sold all over the country.

In China, capons are often raised specifically for consumption during Chinese New Year.

Legal status

In the UK physical caponisation was made illegal in 1982 via The Welfare of Livestock (Prohibited Operations) Regulations 1982. This was reinforced in 2007 by The Mutilations (Permitted Procedures) (England) Regulations 2007 which made castration of all domesticated birds illegal. It is not illegal to import castrated animals and capons are available for sale in the UK.

Gallery

See also
Poularde

References

External links

 "Easy-On" Caponizing Set Surgery instructions from a home kit, published for Sears, Roebuck & Co.

Veterinary castration
Poultry farming
Chickens